Kilshannig is a Gaelic Athletic Association club based in the parish of Glantane in County Cork, Ireland. The parish in north Cork is split into three villages, Glantane, Dromahane and Bweeng. The club was founded in the same year as GAA's founding, in 1884.  Cill Seannaigh comes from St Senach, who founded a church near the present site of the Church of Ireland at Newberry. The club fields Gaelic football and hurling teams in competitions organised by Cork county board, and by the Avondhu division.

History

Early years
The club goes as far back as 1921, when it played in the Duhallow division. The team in the parish was known as the Lombardstown team.  They reached the county final that year, when they were beaten by Redmonds.  In 1921, two men were chosen to play for the Cork Juniors against Kerry. They were Sonny Breen and William C. O'Connell.  Hurling was very popular in the 1920s and 1930s.  The team was known as "Brittas Rovers".  In 1933, Brittas Rovers were beaten by Marshalstown in the North Cork Junior A Hurling Championship final.

1940s and 1950s
In 1945, a meeting was held to form one team in the parish called Kilshannig United. In 1950, it was decided to drop "United" from the name. Things began to look up for the club in 1952, when the novice football team won their first trophies in the Castlemagner Club tournament. In 1953, the club won its first novice championship title, beating Functeon Vale in the final. In the same year, Pat O'Sullivan played with the Cork minor football team.  In 1955, Kilshannig reached their first North Cork Junior A Football Championship final. They were beaten by Mitchelstown. The minor footballers also reached their first North Cork final in the same year.

In 1959, Kilshannig won its first North Cork final, beating Castletownroche by two points. The team were beaten by Dromtarriffe in the second round of the county. In the same year, Pat O'Sullivan played for the Cork Junior Footballers and the Cork Senior Hurlers.

1960s
In 1960, the Junior 'B' hurlers defeated Kilworth in the Championship final.  In 1962, Kilshannig won their first ever minor football Championship by defeating Glanworth in the final. Johnny O'Flynn captained the Cork Senior Football team to the Munster Senior Football Championship final against Kerry. Tim Breen and Dan O'Sullivan were also on that team. In 1964, Kilshannig won their first ever Under 21 Football Championship defeating Glanworth. In 1965, Kilshannig won their second North Cork Junior Football Championship, defeating Grange in a thrilling final. Kilshannig were defeated by Dohenys after a replay. In 1967, Kilshannig once again won the North Cork Junior Football Championship by upsetting all the odds, when they beat Glanworth in the final by eight points. That year, Jerry Horgan won an All-Ireland Minor Football Championship medal with Cork.  They defeated by Midleton in the County first round. In 1968, Kilshannig repeated the success of the previous year and beat Glanworth again in the final. Unfortunately, Kilshannig were once again knocked out of the first round of the Cork Junior Football Championship, this time by Adrigole.

1970s
In 1972, the Kilshannig Minor footballers kept the flag flying by winning the North Cork Championship. However, they were beaten by Macroom in the first round of the county.

1980s
In 1985, Kilshannig were victorious in the North Cork Junior Football Championship. Their county championship campaign led to a nail-biting conclusion when they overcame Valley Rovers in the Cork Junior Football Championship final in Páirc Uí Chaoimh following a replay. Their success continued the following year under coach John O'Mahony. Their inaugural campaign in the Intermediate grade was a bittersweet one. A local derby versus near neighbours Mallow drew an enormous crowd to Buttevant. Kilshannig's resounding victory was not on the cards as Mallow had been much more impressive in the previous round, easily defeating Nemo Rangers. The county final was played in Macroom versus Castletownbere. While Kilshannig led for the majority of the game, a late goal snatched victory for the Beara men. After this painful defeat, 1987 proved to be a year for renewal and recharging and a first-round exit to Fermoy resulted. The following year, 1988 brought Kilshannig back to the Cork Intermediate Football Championship final versus Ballincollig on 11 September. Following a thrilling game, a late goal sealed the County Championship for Kilshannig. William O'Riordan received the cup on the steps of Páirc Uí Chaoimh.  After a victory in the North Cork Junior B Hurling Championship, the county campaign went well. Ultimately, Kilshannig completed a Cork Intermediate Football Championship and Cork Junior B Hurling Championship double with victory over Whitechurch in Grenagh. Pat Murphy captained the side. 1989 saw the club competing in the Senior grade of football.

1990s
Following some near misses in the senior championship, it was decided that the club would re-grade to intermediate and then junior level, in the early years of the 1990s. In 1996, Cork Junior Football Championship honours were secured with a final victory over Youghal. The club continued at an intermediate grade of football for the remainder of the decade.

2000–2009 
Kilshannig contested the Junior A football final in 2006 and 2010 against Glanworth and Mitchelstown respectively, losing on both occasions. Kilshannig secured a minor county victory against Nemo Rangers in 2009.

Recent Success 
The turn of the decade has seen considerable success for the underage teams of Kilshannig, which bodes well for the future of the club. The 1996–2000 age groups have been especially responsible for this upturn in fortunes. 2010–2013 saw the club amass over 10 North Cork championships in both hurling and football between U11 and U14, supplemented by a Cork U15 B Hurling Championship in 2011, and a Cork U13 A Football Championship in 2012. 2012 saw Kilshannig teams playing at Premier level for the first time in our history, with our U13 Hurlers playing at Premier 2. Our underage football teams have consistently performed at Premier level since. Our 1999–2000 players continued their success with Championship wins at regional level in hurling at U14 and U15 in 2014. Our adults replicated this success, capturing the North Cork Junior A Football Championship for the first time in 18 years, beating Ballyclough in the final before being knocked out of the County by St. Finbarrs. Our U21s were also victorious, defeating Buttevant in the North Cork U21 B final, but eventually tasting defeat at the hands of Courcey Rovers. Since 2015, the club has seen unprecedented success at U21 and Minor level. 2015 saw our minor hurlers claim the Cork Minor B Hurling Championship with a fantastic double win over Kilworth, defeating them in both the County and North Cork final. 2016 topped this further, with the Minors claiming the Cork Minor A Football Championship for the first time in the club's history with a historic win over O’Donovan Rossa in CIT, while they also claimed the North Cork Minor A Hurling League. Many members of this panel were leading players with the U16s who claimed a Cork Premier 2 U16 Football Championship, defeating Carbery Rangers in the final, a North Cork U16 A Hurling Championship and League, defeating Ballygiblin in both, and a Cork U16 A Hurling League, coming at the expense of Sam Maguires . These achievements saw the club being awarded the Rebel Óg Monthly Award for November 2016, as well as the overall award for the entire year. While many believed 2016 could not matched, 2017 proved to be yet another historic year. Between U21 and Minor, an incredible 10 finals were contested in both hurling and football. Success arrived in the form of a Cork U21 B Football and Hurling Championship, defeating Newmarket and Sarsfields in the finals, a North Cork Under-21 B Hurling Championship at the expense of Ballyhea, and a Cork Premier 2A Minor Football League, defeating Valley Rovers in Pairc Ui Chaoimh. The dual U21 win was the first of its kind in the history of the club and gained Countywide recognition. 2018 carried on in similar fashion, with our U21 footballers defeating Mitchelstown in the final of the Avondhu U21 A Football Championship, the first time in 56 years the U21 A has been won by a Kilshannig team. The U21s proceeded to defeat Valley Rovers in the first round of the county, followed by a famous win over St.Finbarrs at the quarter-final stage in Mallow. This journey ultimately came to an end at the semi-final stage, when they were defeated by Nemo Rangers in Mallow on a scoreline of 1-08 2-13. Furthur success came to the parish when John Quinn won the 2017 Scor na n'Og final in Gortroe for his rendition of 'The Green Fields of France'

2019 
The 2019 Junior campaign started in Carrigoon against Ballyclough in May, winning 3-24 to 0-04. Kilavullen were next in round 2, with the Glantane side winning 1-16 to 0-08. The Avondhu campaign ended in victory for the side beating Kilworth 1-16 to 0-08.
The County campaign began in Rathcormac with Kilshannig in flying form against Passage, winning out 4-17 to 0-03. Ballinhassig were next in a tough game but the side won 2-10 to 0-04. The County semi-final was the toughest game of the year however the side came out on top once again, 1-11 to 1-09. The end of the year saw Kilshannig beating St. James’ in the County Final in a score line of 0-22 to 0-11.

The side had a clean sweep in Avondhu by also winning out the Junior B(2) Football Championship, Division 1 Football League and Division 2 Football League. The Under-21's also coming up trumps in the division, beating Douglas in the quarter final to secure them a place in the county semi-final against St. Michael's, which the side fell short in the finish.

The hurling campaign wasn't as exciting as the football but there were still some great games. The campaign started in Ballyclough, with the side beating Charleville 3-15 to 4-09. Next was Dromina, with Kilshannig coming out on top in Churchtown 0-09 to 2-19. Unfortunately the road came to an end in Killavullen, where Kilshannig lost to Harbour Rovers 2-18 to 0-10. The side beat near neighbours Clyda Rovers 0-19 to 0-09 in Division 1 of the League. The side's second team were bowed out of the Junior C Championship by Fermoy 1-14 to Kilshannig's 0-16. The side fell short again in the League by a point to Milford. The U21's came close to more silverware for the club but were beaten 0-13 to 0-09 by Fermoy.

Notable players
Recent years have seen Kilshannig being represented at a number of inter-county levels. Killian O’Hanlon is currently a regular with the Cork Senior Footballers, having already represented Cork at Junior in 2016 and 2017, at U21 in 2014 and at Minor in 2011. 2019 saw Killian start in the 2019 Senior Championship. 2017 saw three further Kilshannig players representing Cork. Brothers Kevin and Conor McMahon were involved with the Cork Minor Footballers, with Conor also representing the U17s. Continuing the clubs recent fashion of dual success, Jack Twomey was a member of the Cork Minor Hurling team. In 2019, the club had 4 representatives on the Cork U20 team that won the All Ireland; Éanna O’Hanlon, Bill Curtin, Kieran Twomey and Colm O’Shea. Along with Ciarán O’Sullivan being a part of the All Ireland Winning Minors. In 2020, the club was well represented again at county level again with Killian playing with the seniors and Éanna, Bill, Colm and Kieran with the U20s. 2021 saw the introductions of Gavin Creedon and Ciarán O’Sullivan  to the U20 footballers  and Shane O’Connell to the minor footballers.
 
The following players represented Cork inter-county teams in various grades:
 
Senior football
 Pat O’Sullivan
 Timmy Breen
 Johnny O'Flynn
 Dan O'Sullivan
 William O Riordan
 Killian O'Hanlon
 Gavin Creedon

 
Junior football
 Mick Geaney
 Mossie Murphy
 Liam O'Callaghan
 Dominic O'Connell
 Jerry O'Connell
 Killian O'Hanlon
 William O'Riordan
 Denis McCarthy
 
U21 Football
 Killian O'Hanlon
 John Quinn

U20 football
 Éanna O'Hanlon
 Colm O’Shea
 Bill Curtin
 John Quinn
 Gavin Creedon
 Ciarán O’Sullivan

 
Minor football
 Éamonn O'Sullivan
 Mossy Murphy
 Dominic O'Connell
 Paul Whelan
 Killian O'Hanlon
 Kevin McMahon
 Conor McMahon
 Ciarán O’Sullivan
 Shane O’Connell
 
Minor hurling
 Pat Corbett
 Éamonn O'Sullivan
 Jack Twomey
 John Quinn
 David Kearney

Honours
 Cork Intermediate Football Championship: Winners (2) 1988, 2022 Runners up-1986
 Cork Junior A Football Championship Winners (3) 1985, 1996, 2019
 Cork Junior B Hurling Championship Winner (1) 1988 Runner-up 1997, 2002
 Cork Under-21 B Football Championship (1) 2017
 Cork Under-21 B Hurling Championship: Winners (1) 2017
 Cork Minor B Hurling Championship Winners (2) 2009, 2015
 Cork Minor B Hurling League Winners (1) 2009
  Cork Premier 2 Minor Football Championship  Winners (1) 2018
 Cork Premier 2A Minor Football League Winners (1) 2017
 Cork Minor A Football Championship Winners (1) 2016 
  Cork Minor A Hurling Championship Runners-up (1) 2017
 North Cork Junior A Hurling Championship Winners (1) 2022 Runners-up (1) 2020
 North Cork Junior A Football Championship Winners (10) 1959, 1965, 1967, 1968, 1976, 1982, 1985, 1996, 2014, 2019 Runners-up (8) 1955, 1958, 1960, 1964, 1977, 1981, 2006, 2010
 North Cork Junior B Football Championship Winners (1) 2019
 Cork Credit Union League Division 6 Winners (1) 2021 
  North Cork Division 1 Football League Winners (2) 2016,2019
  North Cork Division 1 Hurling League Winners (1) 2019
  North Cork Division 2 Football League Winners (1) 2019
 North Cork Division 2 Hurling League Winners (1) 2015
  North Cork Division 3 Football League Winners (1) 2017
  North Cork Under-21 A Football Championship Winners (2) 2018,2019 Runners-up (1) 2017
  North Cork U-21 A Hurling Championship Runners-Up (2) 2018,2019
  North Cork Under-21 B Football Championship Winners (1) 2014
  North Cork Under-21 B Hurling Championship Winners (1) 2017
  North Cork Minor A Hurling Championship Winners (1) 2018 Runners-up (1) 2017
  North Cork Minor A Hurling League Winners (1) 2016
 North Cork Minor B Hurling Championship Winners (3) 2008, 2009, 2015
 North Cork Minor B Hurling League Winners (1) 2009

References

External links
 Official Kilshannig Club website

Gaelic games clubs in County Cork
Gaelic football clubs in County Cork
Hurling clubs in County Cork